Weightlifting has featured as a sport at the Youth Olympic Summer Games since its first edition in 2010 in Singapore. The Youth Olympic Games are a multi-sport event and the games are held every four years just like the Olympic Games. Eleven weightlifting events (6 for boys and 5 for girls) were contested at the 2010 and 2014 games; for the 2018 games in Buenos Aires that number raised by 12 (6 for boys and girls).

Summary

Medal table
As of the 2018 Summer Youth Olympics

See also
Weightlifting at the Summer Olympics
IWF Youth World Weightlifting Championships

References

External links
Youth Olympic Games

Youth Olympic Games
Sports at the Summer Youth Olympics